Chandra Pasma (born c. 1980) is a Canadian politician, who was elected to the Legislative Assembly of Ontario in the 2022 provincial election. She represents the district of Ottawa West—Nepean as a member of the Ontario New Democratic Party.

Background 
Before her election as MPP for Ottawa West—Nepean, Pasma worked as a public policy researcher for the Canadian Union of Public Employees (CUPE). Previously, she served as an advisor to the federal New Democratic Party.

Pasma has also worked for Citizens for Public Justice, and prior to that worked for Conservative MP Dave MacKenzie until 2006.

Political career 
On July 13, 2022 Pasma was named as the Official Opposition critic for poverty and homelessness reduction by interim ONDP leader Peter Tabuns. She was later made education critic after Marit Stiles resigned to run for the 2023 Ontario New Democratic Party leadership election.

Electoral record

References 

Living people
21st-century Canadian politicians
21st-century Canadian women politicians
Ontario New Democratic Party MPPs
Women MPPs in Ontario
Politicians from Ottawa
Year of birth missing (living people)